Alfred Michael Ivey (11 July 1928 – 10 August 2001) was an English first-class cricketer.

Ivey was born at Leeds in July 1939, where he was educated at a grammar school in the city. From there he went up to Brasenose College, Oxford. While studying at Oxford he made his debut in first-class cricket for the Oxford University against the Free Foresters at Oxford in 1949. He made five further first-class appearances for Oxford University across the 1950 and 1951 seasons, but was unable to command a regular place in the team. Playing predominantly as a batsman, Ivey scored 210 runs for Oxford, with a high score of 40. His final appearance in first-class cricket came in the 1951 season for the Free Foresters against Oxford University. He died at Hammersmith in August 2001.

References

External links

1928 births
2001 deaths
Cricketers from Leeds
Alumni of Brasenose College, Oxford
English cricketers
Oxford University cricketers
Free Foresters cricketers